The Western New York National Cemetery is a new United States National Cemetery located in the Town of Pembroke in Genesee County, approximately  east of Buffalo and  west of Rochester in New York. The cemetery's street address is in Corfu but the property is actually located in the town of Pembroke.  It encompasses  and is the seventh National Cemetery operated by the United States Department of Veterans Affairs in the New York.  It is expected to have room for the burial of over 96,000 veterans and be open for 70 years.  The cemetery is located near exit 48A of the New York State Thruway.

History 
The VA purchased the property in May 2014 for $625,000. The location provides a burial option much closer to the Western New York population centers than the Bath National Cemetery in Steuben County. Prior to the creation of the cemetery, the Western New York area had the largest veterans population without a nearby veterans cemetery.
The cemetery was selected as a result of a 2011 VA policy intended to provide national cemeteries close to all population centers. The Fiscal Year 2017 Military Construction and Veterans Affairs Appropriations Bill included $36 million for cemetery construction which will allow construction to begin in 2017.

Naming
The permanent name for the cemetery, based upon geographic location, was announced in May 2016. US Senator Charles Schumer proposed the cemetery be named after a local war hero William J. Donovan. The policy of the VA is that National cemeteries be named based on the geographic area in which the cemetery is located.

Facilities
Development will include roads, landscaping, administration and maintenance buildings, a public information center, and restrooms. Cremated remains will be interred in marble columbariums. Design is planned to be completed in 2016, and construction of the first  section is expected to take three years.  Construction of subsequent phases will occur when additional burial space is required.

References

External links 
Official website

United States national cemeteries
Cemeteries in Genesee County, New York
Tourist attractions in Genesee County, New York